Wendy Ann Foster (  Cheesman; 1937 – 15 January 1989) was a British architect and co-founder of Team 4 and Foster Associates.

Career

Team 4 was an architectural firm, established in 1963 by architecture graduates Su Rogers (née Brumwell), Wendy Cheesman, Norman Foster and Richard Rogers. The firm originally included Wendy Cheesman's sister, Georgie Wolton, who, as the only qualified architect of the group, allowed the practice to function. Georgie Cheesman left after only a few months, leaving the remaining members to try to pass their professional exams while continuing to practice.

The notable buildings that she worked on while at Team 4, includes the first ever house to win a RIBA award - Creek Vean House, Feock, Cornwall, England (1966), Reliance Controls factory, Swindon (1967), Jaffe House (also known as Skybreak House), which was Humphrey Spender's house, Maldon, Essex (1965-1966) and Wates Housing, Coulsdon, Surrey (1965), all in England.

By June 1967, Foster and Rogers, had both decided to dissolve the firm. The Rogerses (Richard and Su) established Richard and Su Rogers Architects and the Fosters (Norman Foster and Wendy Foster, née Cheesman) established Foster Associates. The notable buildings that Wendy Foster was involved in include Sainsbury Centre for Visual Arts, Willis Faber and Dumas building, and the HSBC Building in Hong Kong.

Private life
Wendy Cheesman married Norman Foster in 1964. She died of cancer in 1989, aged 51, when she was still a partner/director at Foster Associates.

See also
List of British architects

References 

 

1937 births
1989 deaths
Deaths from cancer in England
Yale School of Architecture alumni
British women architects
Spouses of life peers